The Messenger Feast or Kivgiq, Kevgiq (Kivgiġñiq in Iñupiaq dialect of North Slope Borough,<ref
 name="refSkills"> Iñupiaq Knowledge and Skills</ref> Kivgiqsuat in King Island Iñupiaq,<ref
 name="refChap2"></ref> Kevgiq in Yup'ik<ref
 name="ref571"></ref>), is a celebratory mid-winter festival in Alaska traditionally held by Iñupiaq (Tikiġaġmiut, Nunamiut...) and Yup'ik peoples after a strong whale harvest.<ref
 name="ref571"/><ref
 name="refHikuta">Hiroko Ikuta (2007), Iñupiaq pride: Kivgiq (Messenger Feast) on the Alaskan North Slope, Études/Inuit/Studies, vol. 31, n° 1-2, 2007, p. 343-364.</ref><ref
 name="refSusan"></ref><ref
 name="refWesternfolklore"></ref>

The event died out early in the twentieth century, when Presbyterian missionaries in the area tried to eliminate traditional ceremonies. Shamanistic rituals are no longer practiced, although some elders have information about these rites. Song and dance have continued to be celebrated by Alaska Natives.

It was named for the two messengers sent to invite the guest village to the festival. Two Messengers (kivgak dual kivgaq sg in Iñupaq; kevgak dual kevgaq sg in Yup'ik) would travel from host village to another village to invite the people to the Kivgiq.

Since the late 20th century, this festival has been held almost every year, but "officially" is held every two or three years in late January or early February. It is called at the discretion of the North Slope Borough Mayor. Kivgiq is an international event that attracts visitors from around the Arctic Circle.

Iñupiat people had celebrated Kivgiq for many centuries. However, the earlier representations of Kivgiq were discontinued in the early 20th century due to social, economical, and environmental pressures.

In 1988, after a lapse of more than 70 years, the modern Kivgiq was reconstructed. It is intended to inspire each Iñupiaq with an even stronger collective identity and enhanced ethnic pride.

See also
Nalukataq
Bladder Festival
Yup'ik dancing

References

1988 establishments in Alaska
Festivals in Alaska
Inupiat culture
Recurring events established in 1988
Tourist attractions in North Slope Borough, Alaska
Yupik culture